The 1992 SWAC men's basketball tournament was held February 27–29, 1992, at the Riverside Centroplex in Baton Rouge, Louisiana. Mississippi Valley State defeated , 85–77 in the championship game. The Delta Devils received the conference's automatic bid to the 1992 NCAA tournament as No. 16 seed in the Southeast Region.

Bracket and results

References

1991–92 Southwestern Athletic Conference men's basketball season
SWAC men's basketball tournament